Športno društvo Cven, commonly referred to as ŠD Cven or simply Cven, is a Slovenian football club that plays in the village of Cven. The club was established in 1993 and competes in the 1. MNL, the fifth tier of the Slovenian football pyramid.

Honours
Slovenian Fourth Division
 Winners: 2002–03, 2003–04

Slovenian Fifth Division
 Winners: 2015–16

Slovenian Sixth Division
 Winners: 2011–12

MNZ Murska Sobota Cup
 Winners: 2002–03

League history since 2002

References

External links
Official website 

Football clubs in Slovenia
Association football clubs established in 1993
1993 establishments in Slovenia